The 1985–86 Philadelphia Flyers season was the Philadelphia Flyers' 19th season in the National Hockey League (NHL). The Flyers lost in the first round of the playoffs in five game to the New York Rangers.

Regular season
The club began the year 12–2–0 (with both losses coming at home to New Jersey and Quebec), which included 10 consecutive wins until goaltender Pelle Lindbergh was fatally injured in a car accident in the early hours of November 10.

Due to the tragedy, back-up Bob Froese became the de facto starter, and the club called up Darren Jensen for relief work. Froese suffered a groin injury in practice prior to the team's next game against the Edmonton Oilers, so Jensen got the start against the defending Stanley Cup champions at the Spectrum on November 14.

Following an emotional memorial service, the Flyers posted a spirited 5–3 win, featuring four goals in the third period to earn their 11th victory in a row. They went on to beat Hartford two days later to set a new franchise record for consecutive wins, then rallied from three-goals down to top the New York Islanders 5–4 in overtime the next day. The Islanders ended the streak two nights later in Uniondale, almost wasting a four-goal lead in an 8–6 decision.

Philly became the first club in the NHL to reach 30 wins, after a 4–0 shutout of the Washington Capitals on January 9, but began to falter in February and early March, losing four straight games and seeing the Capitals climb within striking distance. The Caps and Flyers each spent time in first place for the remainder of the schedule, but the orange and black took the division crown on the last day of the season (April 6) with a come-from-behind 5–3 home win.

In a 7–3 loss to the Devils on March 8, Tim Kerr set an NHL record with his 29th power-play goal of the season, passing Hall-of-Famer Phil Esposito's mark. He finished the year with 34, the league record to this day.

Propp had the best chance of his career to crack the 100-point mark, but that was derailed on March 6, when Buffalo Sabres forward Lindy Ruff caught him in the eye with a high stick. The incident cost Propp several games, and he finished with a team-high 97 points while also causing him to wear a visor for the remainder of his career.

Bob Clarke made a couple minor deals during the season, trading Ed Hospodar and the enigmatic Todd Bergen to the Minnesota North Stars for Dave Richter and Bo Berglund on November 29. Neither player lasted beyond the season with the Flyers, while Hospodar returned in 1986–87. Also, Joe Paterson and Len Hachborn were sent in separate deals to the Los Angeles Kings, and Chico Resch was acquired from the Devils for a draft pick in early March.

Froese finished second in voting for the Vezina Trophy. Mark Howe finished second in voting for the Norris Trophy and third in voting for the Hart Memorial Trophy as league MVP. Howe was named to the first NHL All-Star team and took home the NHL Plus-Minus Award – the defense pairing of Howe and Brad McCrimmon finished with a +85 and a +83 respectively – while Froese was named to the second NHL All-Star team and was the co-winner with Jensen of the William M. Jennings Trophy.

Season standings

Playoffs
Despite their regular season success, an emotionally exhausted Flyers team lost in the first round of the playoffs to the New York Rangers in five games.

Schedule and results

Regular season

|- style="background:#fcf;"
| 1 || October 10 || New Jersey Devils || 5–6 || 0–1–0 || 0 || 
|- style="background:#cfc;"
| 2 || October 12 || @ Pittsburgh Penguins || 4–2 || 1–1–0 || 2 || 
|- style="background:#cfc;"
| 3 || October 13 || @ Washington Capitals || 4–2 || 2–1–0 || 4 || 
|- style="background:#fcf;"
| 4 || October 17 || Quebec Nordiques || 1–2 || 2–2–0 || 4 || 
|- style="background:#cfc;"
| 5 || October 19 || Minnesota North Stars || 7–3 || 3–2–0 || 6 || 
|- style="background:#cfc;"
| 6 || October 20 || @ Chicago Black Hawks || 5–2 || 4–2–0 || 8 || 
|- style="background:#cfc;"
| 7 || October 24 || Hartford Whalers || 3–0 || 5–2–0 || 10 || 
|- style="background:#cfc;"
| 8 || October 27 || Vancouver Canucks || 7–4 || 6–2–0 || 12 || 
|- style="background:#cfc;"
| 9 || October 30 || @ Montreal Canadiens || 5–4 || 7–2–0 || 14 || 
|-

|- style="background:#cfc;"
| 10 || November 2 || @ Quebec Nordiques || 5–3 || 8–2–0 || 16 || 
|- style="background:#cfc;"
| 11 || November 3 || Los Angeles Kings || 7–4 || 9–2–0 || 18 || 
|- style="background:#cfc;"
| 12 || November 6 || @ New York Rangers || 5–2 || 10–2–0 || 20 || 
|- style="background:#cfc;"
| 13 || November 7 || Chicago Black Hawks || 6–2 || 11–2–0 || 22 || 
|- style="background:#cfc;"
| 14 || November 9 || Boston Bruins || 5–3 || 12–2–0 || 24 || 
|- style="background:#cfc;"
| 15 || November 14 || Edmonton Oilers || 5–3 || 13–2–0 || 26 || 
|- style="background:#cfc;"
| 16 || November 16 || @ Hartford Whalers || 5–2 || 14–2–0 || 28 || 
|- style="background:#cfc;"
| 17 || November 17 || New York Islanders || 5–4 OT || 15–2–0 || 30 || 
|- style="background:#fcf;"
| 18 || November 19 || @ New York Islanders || 6–8 || 15–3–0 || 30 || 
|- style="background:#cfc;"
| 19 || November 21 || Hartford Whalers || 3–0 || 16–3–0 || 32 || 
|- style="background:#fcf;"
| 20 || November 23 || @ Boston Bruins || 4–5 || 16–4–0 || 32 || 
|- style="background:#cfc;"
| 21 || November 24 || Pittsburgh Penguins || 7–4 || 17–4–0 || 34 || 
|- style="background:#cfc;"
| 22 || November 27 || Winnipeg Jets || 6–1 || 18–4–0 || 36 || 
|- style="background:#cfc;"
| 23 || November 29 || @ Minnesota North Stars || 4–1 || 19–4–0 || 38 || 
|-

|- style="background:#fcf;"
| 24 || December 1 || @ Winnipeg Jets || 1–2 || 19–5–0 || 38 || 
|- style="background:#fcf;"
| 25 || December 3 || @ Detroit Red Wings || 1–4 || 19–6–0 || 38 || 
|- style="background:#fcf;"
| 26 || December 5 || Toronto Maple Leafs || 3–6 || 19–7–0 || 38 || 
|- style="background:#cfc;"
| 27 || December 7 || New York Rangers || 4–0 || 20–7–0 || 40 || 
|- style="background:#fcf;"
| 28 || December 8 || @ New York Rangers || 1–3 || 20–8–0 || 40 || 
|- style="background:#cfc;"
| 29 || December 10 || Boston Bruins || 7–4 || 21–8–0 || 42 || 
|- style="background:#cfc;"
| 30 || December 12 || Montreal Canadiens || 6–3 || 22–8–0 || 44 || 
|- style="background:#cfc;"
| 31 || December 14 || @ Detroit Red Wings || 6–4 || 23–8–0 || 46 || 
|- style="background:#fcf;"
| 32 || December 17 || @ New Jersey Devils || 4–7 || 23–9–0 || 46 || 
|- style="background:#cfc;"
| 33 || December 19 || New Jersey Devils || 6–3 || 24–9–0 || 48 || 
|- style="background:#cfc;"
| 34 || December 21 || @ Pittsburgh Penguins || 4–2 || 25–9–0 || 50 || 
|- style="background:#cfc;"
| 35 || December 22 || Pittsburgh Penguins || 3–2 OT || 26–9–0 || 52 || 
|- style="background:#cfc;"
| 36 || December 27 || @ Vancouver Canucks || 6–1 || 27–9–0 || 54 || 
|- style="background:#cfc;"
| 37 || December 28 || @ Calgary Flames || 6–5 || 28–9–0 || 56 || 
|- style="background:#fcf;"
| 38 || December 31 || @ Edmonton Oilers || 3–4 || 28–10–0 || 56 || 
|-

|- style="background:#cfc;"
| 39 || January 2 || @ Los Angeles Kings || 7–4 || 29–10–0 || 58 || 
|- style="background:#fcf;"
| 40 || January 4 || @ St. Louis Blues || 1–2 || 29–11–0 || 58 || 
|- style="background:#cfc;"
| 41 || January 9 || Washington Capitals || 4–0 || 30–11–0 || 60 || 
|- style="background:#cfc;"
| 42 || January 11 || @ New Jersey Devils || 8–4 || 31–11–0 || 62 || 
|- style="background:#cfc;"
| 43 || January 12 || Calgary Flames || 3–0 || 32–11–0 || 64 || 
|- style="background:#cfc;"
| 44 || January 14 || New Jersey Devils || 3–2 || 33–11–0 || 66 || 
|- style="background:#fcf;"
| 45 || January 17 || New York Islanders || 3–4 || 33–12–0 || 66 || 
|- style="background:#fcf;"
| 46 || January 18 || @ Washington Capitals || 2–5 || 33–13–0 || 66 || 
|- style="background:#fcf;"
| 47 || January 21 || @ New York Islanders || 3–7 || 33–14–0 || 66 || 
|- style="background:#cfc;"
| 48 || January 23 || Detroit Red Wings || 5–2 || 34–14–0 || 68 || 
|- style="background:#cfc;"
| 49 || January 25 || @ St. Louis Blues || 1–0 || 35–14–0 || 70 || 
|- style="background:#ffc;"
| 50 || January 28 || @ Pittsburgh Penguins || 2–2 OT || 35–14–1 || 71 || 
|- style="background:#fcf;"
| 51 || January 30 || @ New York Islanders || 4–8 || 35–15–1 || 71 || 
|-

|- style="background:#ffc;"
| 52 || February 1 || @ Quebec Nordiques || 2–2 OT || 35–15–2 || 72 || 
|- style="background:#cfc;"
| 53 || February 6 || St. Louis Blues || 4–3 || 36–15–2 || 74 || 
|- style="background:#ffc;"
| 54 || February 8 || Minnesota North Stars || 3–3 OT || 36–15–3 || 75 || 
|- style="background:#ffc;"
| 55 || February 9 || @ Chicago Black Hawks || 2–2 OT || 36–15–4 || 76 || 
|- style="background:#cfc;"
| 56 || February 12 || @ Buffalo Sabres || 4–0 || 37–15–4 || 78 || 
|- style="background:#cfc;"
| 57 || February 13 || New York Islanders || 6–3 || 38–15–4 || 80 || 
|- style="background:#fcf;"
| 58 || February 15 || @ Montreal Canadiens || 3–5 || 38–16–4 || 80 || 
|- style="background:#cfc;"
| 59 || February 17 || Winnipeg Jets || 8–4 || 39–16–4 || 82 || 
|- style="background:#cfc;"
| 60 || February 20 || Los Angeles Kings || 5–3 || 40–16–4 || 84 || 
|- style="background:#cfc;"
| 61 || February 22 || Washington Capitals || 3–1 || 41–16–4 || 86 || 
|- style="background:#fcf;"
| 62 || February 27 || @ Calgary Flames || 4–7 || 41–17–4 || 86 || 
|- style="background:#fcf;"
| 63 || February 28 || @ Vancouver Canucks || 1–3 || 41–18–4 || 86 || 
|-

|- style="background:#fcf;"
| 64 || March 2 || @ Edmonton Oilers || 1–2 OT || 41–19–4 || 86 || 
|- style="background:#fcf;"
| 65 || March 4 || Buffalo Sabres || 4–6 || 41–20–4 || 86 || 
|- style="background:#cfc;"
| 66 || March 6 || Toronto Maple Leafs || 7–4 || 42–20–4 || 88 || 
|- style="background:#fcf;"
| 67 || March 8 || @ New Jersey Devils || 3–7 || 42–21–4 || 88 || 
|- style="background:#cfc;"
| 68 || March 9 || @ New York Rangers || 4–1 || 43–21–4 || 90 || 
|- style="background:#cfc;"
| 69 || March 13 || Washington Capitals || 2–0 || 44–21–4 || 92 || 
|- style="background:#cfc;"
| 70 || March 15 || @ Toronto Maple Leafs || 6–5 OT || 45–21–4 || 94 || 
|- style="background:#cfc;"
| 71 || March 16 || New Jersey Devils || 4–1 || 46–21–4 || 96 || 
|- style="background:#cfc;"
| 72 || March 20 || Pittsburgh Penguins || 5–1 || 47–21–4 || 98 || 
|- style="background:#cfc;"
| 73 || March 22 || New York Rangers || 4–2 || 48–21–4 || 100 || 
|- style="background:#fcf;"
| 74 || March 23 || @ Washington Capitals || 5–6 || 48–22–4 || 100 || 
|- style="background:#fcf;"
| 75 || March 27 || Buffalo Sabres || 0–1 || 48–23–4 || 100 || 
|- style="background:#cfc;"
| 76 || March 29 || New York Rangers || 8–2 || 49–23–4 || 102 || 
|-

|- style="background:#cfc;"
| 77 || April 1 || New York Islanders || 4–2 || 50–23–4 || 104 || 
|- style="background:#cfc;"
| 78 || April 2 || @ New York Rangers || 3–2 || 51–23–4 || 106 || 
|- style="background:#cfc;"
| 79 || April 5 || @ Pittsburgh Penguins || 4–3 OT || 52–23–4 || 108 || 
|- style="background:#cfc;"
| 80 || April 6 || Washington Capitals || 5–3 || 53–23–4 || 110 || 
|-

|-
| Legend:

Playoffs

|- style="background:#fcf;"
| 1 || April 9 || New York Rangers || 2–6 || Rangers lead 1–0 || 
|- style="background:#cfc;"
| 2 || April 10 || New York Rangers || 2–1 || Series tied 1–1 || 
|- style="background:#fcf;"
| 3 || April 12 || @ New York Rangers || 2–5 || Rangers lead 2–1 || 
|- style="background:#cfc;"
| 4 || April 13 || @ New York Rangers || 7–1 || Series tied 2–2 || 
|- style="background:#fcf;"
| 5 || April 15 || New York Rangers || 2–5 || Rangers win 3–2 || 
|-

|-
| Legend:

Player statistics

Scoring
 Position abbreviations: C = Center; D = Defense; G = Goaltender; LW = Left Wing; RW = Right Wing
  = Joined team via a transaction (e.g., trade, waivers, signing) during the season. Stats reflect time with the Flyers only.
  = Left team via a transaction (e.g., trade, waivers, release) during the season. Stats reflect time with the Flyers only.

Goaltending
  = Joined team via a transaction (e.g., trade, waivers, signing) during the season. Stats reflect time with the Flyers only.
  = Left team via a transaction (e.g., trade, waivers, release) during the season. Stats reflect time with the Flyers only.

Awards and records

Awards

Records

Among the team records set during the 1985–86 season was a 13-game winning streak from October 19 to November 17. On November 3, Tim Kerr set a team record (since tied multiple times) by scoring three powerplay goals in a game. Pelle Eklund’s nine consecutive games with an assist from March 2 to March 20 is a team rookie record. Kerr’s 34 powerplay goals on the season is an NHL record. Mark Howe’s +87 plus/minus rating is a franchise single season high and his seven shorthanded goals tied the franchise record. Howe also set franchise marks for defenseman for goals scored (24) and points (82). Eklund set the team rookie record for assists (51). The team’s 53 wins on the season tied the high mark set during the previous season. Their four ties during the season is the fewest in team history, while the one home tie and three road ties is tied for the fewest.

During the second period of game four of their division semifinal series against the New York Rangers, the Flyers tied a team record for most goals in a single playoff period (5) and set a team record for fastest five-goals scored in a playoff game, taking seven minutes and forty-eight seconds to do so.

Transactions
The Flyers were involved in the following transactions from May 31, 1985, the day after the deciding game of the 1985 Stanley Cup Finals, through May 24, 1986, the day of the deciding game of the 1986 Stanley Cup Finals.

Trades

Players acquired

Players lost

Signings

Draft picks

Philadelphia's picks at the 1985 NHL Entry Draft, which was held at the Toronto Convention Centre in Toronto, Ontario, on June 15, 1985. The Flyers traded their tenth-round pick, 210th overall, to the Boston Bruins for Ian Armstrong on May 24, 1984.

Farm teams
The Flyers were affiliated with the Hershey Bears of the AHL and the Kalamazoo Wings of the IHL.

Notes

References
General
 
 
 
Specific

Philadelphia Flyers seasons
Philadelphia
Philadelphia
Patrick Division champion seasons
Philadelphia
Philadelphia